Adonxs On Tour is the ongoing first concert tour by Slovak singer-songwriter Adonxs, in support of his debut solo studio album, Age of Adonxs, which was released on November 11, 2022. The tour consists of six announced dates in Slovakia and the Czech Republic, starting on November 16, 2022, in Trenčín, Slovakia, and finishing on December 7, 2022, in Prague, Czech Republic.

Background and development 
On September 29, 2022, Adoxns announced through his social media accounts that he would embark on a concert tour across Slovakia and Czechia in support of his debut solo studio album. On October 30, 2022, he announced the album title, Age of Adonxs. The album was officially released six days prior to the start of the tour, on November 11, 2022.

Czech singer Maella opened for Adonxs in all shows of the tour. Adoxns performed all the songs from his debut album, including "Two Romeos", a song he previously performed at a solidarity rally in October 2022 in memory of two queer victims of the 2022 terrorist attack outside an LGBT bar in Bratislava, Slovakia.

In celebration of the launch of the debut album, Adonxs invited his two producers on stage of the Bratislava concert, and painted the compact disc with a blue nail polish that he is known for using in his pre-show ritual for good luck.

Set list 
Songs performed during Adonxs On Tour:

 "A Night of a Million Strangers"
 "Moving On"
 "Hold Back the River"
 "Cold Summer"
 "Your Town"
 "Two Romeos"
 "Foreplay"
 "Game"
 "Skin"
 "Drivers License"
 "Overthinker"
 "Snow Moon"
 "Final Round"
 "It's a Sin"

Tour dates

References 

2022 concert tours